Croatian–Turkish relations are the bilateral relations between Croatia and Turkey.

History 
Relations between the two countries started in 1991 with the recognition of independent Croatia by Turkey.  Diplomatic relations were established in 1992.

Political relations 
Croatia and Turkey are both members of the Council of Europe, the North Atlantic Treaty Organization (NATO), the Organization for Security and Co-operation in Europe (OSCE), the World Trade Organization (WTO) and the Union for the Mediterranean. Also both have been EU candidates since 2005 to 2013, when Croatia joined the EU as the 28th member prior to Turkey.

There are approximately 300 Turks in Croatia.

Economic relations 
Trade volume between Turkey and Croatia was $273.4 million in 2006.

In 2006, more than 22,300 Croatian tourists visited Turkey.

Resident diplomatic missions
 Croatia has an embassy in Ankara and a consulate-general in Istanbul.
 Turkey has an embassy in Zagreb.

See also 
 Foreign relations of Croatia
 Foreign relations of Turkey 
 Bosnia and Herzegovina–Turkey relations
 Turkey–European Union relations
 2013 enlargement of the European Union
 Croatian diaspora 
 Turks in Croatia
 Turks in Europe
 Turkey–Yugoslavia relations
 Ottoman Monuments of Ilok

References

External links 

 Turkey´s Political Relations with Croatia / Rep. of Turkey Ministry of Foreign Affairs

 
Turkey
Bilateral relations of Turkey